The Chembar is a river of Penza Oblast, Russia. It is a left tributary of the Vorona. Upstream from its confluence with the Maly Chembar near Belinsky, it is called Bolshoy Chembar.

References 

Rivers of Penza Oblast